There is no longer a station building at Speed; however, the platform remains in relatively good condition. The station also contains a siding and grain silos.

External links
 Melway map at street-directory.com.au
 Vicrail - Speed photos

Disused railway stations in Victoria (Australia)